The 2020 Clean Harbors 200 was the 20th stock car race of the 2020 NASCAR Gander RV & Outdoors Truck Series season and the first race of the Round of 8. The race was originally going to be held at Eldora Speedway for the Eldora Dirt Derby, but due to the COVID-19 pandemic, NASCAR was forced to move the race to Kansas City, Kansas and give Kansas Speedway, a  permanent D-shaped oval racetrack, a temporary third date. The race was held on Saturday, October 17, 2020. The race was extended from the scheduled 134 laps to 139 laps due to a NASCAR overtime finish. After a final restart that was caused by Zane Smith wrecked while trying to pass the leader Brett Moffitt, Brett Moffitt with 2 to go would pull away from the field and win his 12th career NASCAR Gander RV & Outdoors Truck Series win, and the first and only win of the season. To fill out the podium, Sheldon Creed of GMS Racing and Austin Hill of Hattori Racing Enterprises finished second and third, respectively.

The race was the NASCAR Gander RV & Outdoors Truck Series debut for ARCA Menards Series driver Hailie Deegan. She would finish 16th, the best result for a debut by a woman.

Background 

Kansas Speedway is a 1.5-mile (2.4 km) tri-oval race track in Kansas City, Kansas. It was built in 2001 and hosts two annual NASCAR race weekends. The NTT IndyCar Series also raced there until 2011. The speedway is owned and operated by the International Speedway Corporation.

Entry list

Starting lineup 
The starting lineup was determined by a metric qualifying system based on the results and fastest lap of the last race, the 2020 Chevrolet Silverado 250 and owner's points. As a result, Chandler Smith of Kyle Busch Motorsports won the pole.

Race results 
Stage 1 Laps: 30

Stage 2 Laps: 30

Stage 3 Laps: 79

References 

2020 NASCAR Gander RV & Outdoors Truck Series
NASCAR races at Kansas Speedway
October 2020 sports events in the United States
2020 in sports in Kansas